Virendra Kumar Baranwal (born 1941) was an Indian poet and writer.

Virendra Kumar Baranwal may also refer to:

 Virendra K Baranwal (born 1960), Indian scientist